Mishni, Kalbajar may refer to:
Mishni (40° 01' N 46° 21' E), Kalbajar
Mishni (40° 03' N 46° 24' E), Kalbajar
Mishni (40° 09' N 46° 03' E), Kalbajar